Goldwing may refer to:

Honda Gold Wing, a Japanese motorcycle
Goldwing Ltd Goldwing, an American ultralight aircraft design
American Goldwing, a 2011 album by Blitzen Trapper
"Goldwing", a song by Billie Eilish from the album Happier Than Ever (2021)

See also
 Goldwin (disambiguation)